Deltophalonia sucuma is a species of moth of the family Tortricidae. It is found in Sucumbíos Province, Ecuador.

References

Moths described in 2010
Cochylini